Tetracladessa is a monotypic moth genus in the family Eriocottidae erected by László Anthony Gozmány and Lajos Vári in 1973. Its sole species, Tetracladessa chalcoxesta, was first described by Edward Meyrick in 1920 (as Tinea chalcoxesta). It is found in South Africa.

The wingspan is about 14 mm. The forewings are light shining brassy bronze. The hindwings are light prismatic grey.

References

Endemic moths of South Africa
Moths described in 1920
Eriocottidae
Moths of Africa
Lepidoptera of South Africa
Monotypic moth genera